The 1997–98 UEFA Champions League was the 43rd season of the UEFA Champions League, UEFA's premier club football tournament, and the sixth since its re-branding from the "European Champion Clubs' Cup" or "European Cup". The tournament was won by Real Madrid, winning for the first time in 32 years, beating 1–0 Juventus who were playing in a third consecutive final. It started a run of three victories in five seasons for the Spanish club.

This season was the first to have six groups, instead of previous four, which meant that only two group runners-up qualified for the quarter finals as opposed to all the second-placed teams. It was also the first to have two qualifying rounds instead of just one. After three years of entering the UEFA Cup, champions of smaller nations returned to the Champions League. For the first time, the runners-up of eight domestic leagues entered into the competition. With Borussia Dortmund being the title holders but finishing third in their domestic league last season, Germany became the first association to provide three teams to the premier European competition.

Borussia Dortmund, the defending champions, were eliminated in the semi-finals by eventual winners Real Madrid.

Armenia, Azerbaijan, Belarus, Slovakia and the Republic of Macedonia all entered their champions for the first time, while the champion of Yugoslavia returned to this competition for the first time since 1991–92 season after the UN ban was lifted.

Association team allocation
Number of teams per country as well as the starting round for each club and seeding were based on 1997 UEFA league coefficient, which takes into account their performance in European competitions from 1992–93 to 1996–97.
Associations ranked 1–8 each have two participants
Associations ranked 9–48 each have one participant (except Liechtenstein and Albania)

Teams
55 teams entered the competition: the national champions of each of the top 48 nations in the UEFA coefficient rankings (except Liechtenstein and Albania), plus the runners-up from each of the top eight nations and UEFA Champions League holders, Borussia Dortmund. The national champions of the associations ranked 1–7 (Italy, Spain, France, Germany, Netherlands, Portugal and England), plus the title holders, all received a bye to the group stage, while the national champions of the associations ranked 8–16 and the runners-up of the associations ranked 1–8 all entered in the second qualifying round. The remaining national champions from the associations ranked 17–48 entered in the first qualifying round.

Notes

Round and draw dates
The schedule of the competition is as follows (all draws are held in Geneva, Switzerland, unless stated otherwise).

Qualifying rounds

First qualifying round

|}

Second qualifying round
Losing teams qualified for the first round of the 1997–98 UEFA Cup.

|}

Note: Winning teams of the first qualifying round were drawn against teams qualified directly for the second qualifying round. Because of the unequal number of teams (15 and 17), Wüstenrot Salzburg and Sparta Prague had to play against each other.

Group stage

Bayer Leverkusen, Beşiktaş, Košice, Feyenoord, Lierse, Newcastle United, Olympiacos, Parma, Sparta Prague (who already qualified for the 1991-92 European Cup group stage) and Sporting CP made their debut in the group stage. Košice lost all six of their group stage matches and thus became the first team to finish a Champions League group stage with no points. They were also first team from Slovakia to play in group stage.

Group A

Group B

Group C

Group D

Group E

Group F

Ranking of second-placed teams

Knockout stage

Bracket

Quarter-finals

|}

The quarter-final between German clubs Bayern Munich and Borussia Dortmund marked the first meeting of two teams from the same country in the Champions League (including the European Cup era, the first game between teams from the same country occurred in 1958–59). With Bayer Leverkusen also having qualified, it marked the first time three clubs from the same nation played in the knockout phase.

Semi-finals

|}

Final

Top goalscorers

See also
1997 UEFA Intertoto Cup
1997–98 UEFA Cup
1997–98 UEFA Cup Winners' Cup

References

External links

 1997–98 All matches – season at UEFA website
 European Cup results at RSSSF
 All scorers 1997–98 UEFA Champions League (excluding qualifying round) according to protocols UEFA + all scorers qualifying round
 1997/98 UEFA Champions League - results and line-ups (archive)

 
1
1997-98